Christina Maria Rieder (born 13 March 1986), better known by their stage name Rykka, is a Swiss-Canadian singer and songwriter from Vancouver, British Columbia. Their songs have been featured on TV, and they have been nominated for several music awards both in British Columbia, and across Canada. On May 12, 2016, they represented Switzerland in the Eurovision Song Contest 2016 in Stockholm with the song "The Last of Our Kind". They sang in the second semi-final of the event.

Life and career

Early years
Rykka was born Christina Maria Rieder in Vancouver, British Columbia, Canada. They began guitar lessons at age 15, then performed at local community festivals. During their two-year program at Vancouver Community College, Christina studied voice with Paula Kremer, while also busking around Vancouver’s Granville Island.

In 2009, they moved to Toronto to record their third independent album Straight Line under the performing name “Christina Maria”. The album was produced with the help of several Canadian producers such as David Baxter, Russel Broom, and Ryan Guldemond of Mother Mother.

In 2010, their album Straight Line was released in Switzerland under Little Jig Records. Rykka stayed and performed both in Switzerland and in Germany, highlighted by a performance on "Sat.1 Frühstücksfernsehen"; a German television channel boasting an average audience of 1 million viewers. They later received a nomination for Demotape Clinic at M4Music in Switzerland.

2012–2013: Kodiak
Kodiak was Rykka's 2012 album.  It marked a significant change in their musical career since they formally changed their stage name from Christina Maria.  They recorded “Kodiak” under the new name Rykka. The record was produced by Ryan Guldemond of Mother Mother, engineered by Shawn Penner, mixed by Warne Livesey and mastered by Andy VanDette. It was released that year in Switzerland by Little Jig Records.

2013–present: Other work
In 2013, Rykka released their fourth studio album Kodiak under Vissen Record in Canada, following a release of the same album in Switzerland the year before. Later in 2013, they won $100,000.00 in BC's Peak Performance Project.

Rykka played a slot in BC’s well-known Squamish Valley Music Festival (2014), opening for another Peak Performance Project winner, We Are the City. They represented Switzerland in the Eurovision Song Contest 2016 with the song "The Last of Our Kind" (written by Rykka, Jeff Dawson, Mike James, and Warne Livesey) after winning ESC 2016 – Die Entscheidungsshow. They placed last in the second semifinal of Eurovision 2016.

Personal life
Rykka splits their time between Zürich in Switzerland and their hometown of Vancouver. They cite Heart, Blondie, Madonna, Björk, Cyndi Lauper, Kate Bush, and Pat Benatar as their main influences. Their paternal grandfather is Swiss. Their maternal ancestry is Dutch, their maternal grandfather comes from Bodegraven and their maternal grandmother is from Woerden. Rykka uses they/them pronouns.

Discography

Studio albums

Singles

As lead artist

As featured artist

Filmography
Blackie was featured on TV series Rookie Blue (S04E07)
The Brink was featured on TV series “Tessa & Scott” (S01E03)

Awards and nominations
Kodiak nominated for Spiritual Album of the Year (Western Canadian Music Awards) (2014)
Map Inside won Best of BC (Shore 104 Radio Station) (2013)
Rykka wins The Peak Performance Project (2013)

References

External links
 "Rykka" official website

Living people
Canadian women rock singers
Canadian experimental musicians
Musicians from Vancouver
21st-century Swiss women singers
Canadian emigrants to Switzerland
Musicians from Zürich
Canadian people of Swiss descent
Canadian people of Dutch descent
Canadian women pop singers
Eurovision Song Contest entrants for Switzerland
Eurovision Song Contest entrants of 2016
1986 births
Swiss pop musicians
Swiss rock musicians
Swiss singer-songwriters
21st-century Canadian women singers
Non-binary singers
Canadian LGBT singers
21st-century Canadian LGBT people